Annan Ennada Thambi Ennada is a 1992 Tamil language drama film directed by Vijay Krishnaraj. The film stars Sivakumar, Arjun, Nirosha and Rekha. The film had music by Gyan Varma and Aabavanan and was released on 25 September 1992. The film was a box office failure.

Cast

Sivakumar as Rakkaiya Gounder
Arjun as Shankar
Vijay Krishnaraj as Ponnar
K. R. Vijaya as Bhavana
Nirosha
Rekha
Manorama
S. S. Chandran
Senthil
Senthamarai
Vennira Aadai Moorthy
Sabitha Anand
T. P. Gajendran

Soundtrack

The film score and the soundtrack were composed by Gyan Varma. The soundtrack, released in 1992, features 7 tracks.

References

1992 films
1990s Tamil-language films
Indian action drama films
1990s action drama films